Patrick Gerald Phillips (9 June 1927 – 29 May 1994) was an Australian rules footballer who played with Richmond in the Victorian Football League (VFL).

Notes

External links 

1927 births
1994 deaths
Australian rules footballers from Victoria (Australia)		
Richmond Football Club players
Chelsea Football Club (Australia) players